"Get Up"  is the fourth and final single released by R.E.M. from the band's sixth album Green (1988). It was included in the limited edition Singleactiongreen box set released in November 1989. The song was released as a single only in the US but failed to chart on the Billboard Hot 100.

The song was written by Michael Stipe about Mike Mills. Mills always seemed to sleep late during their recording sessions for Green. This was Stipe's call for Mills to get up and work. However, Mills did not find this out until a concert in the late 1990s, when Stipe introduced the song as being about him.

The video for the song was created by a young filmmaker named Eric Darnell, who had recently graduated from the CalArts program in experimental animation and who went on to co-direct the mainstream computer animated features Antz and Madagascar.

In the film Tourfilm, which features footage from R.E.M.'s tour in 1989, Stipe introduces this song as his favorite.

During the bridge, several music boxes are played at once.  This was the idea of Bill Berry, who had originally envisioned this in a dream.

Track listing
 "Get Up" (Bill Berry, Peter Buck, Mike Mills, Michael Stipe) – 2:35
 "Funtime" (David Bowie, Iggy Pop) – 2:14

References

1989 singles
R.E.M. songs
Songs written by Bill Berry
Songs written by Peter Buck
Songs written by Mike Mills
Songs written by Michael Stipe
Warner Records singles
1988 songs
Song recordings produced by Michael Stipe
Song recordings produced by Scott Litt
Song recordings produced by Mike Mills
Song recordings produced by Peter Buck
Song recordings produced by Bill Berry
Bubblegum pop songs